The Men's 400 metres at the 2010 Commonwealth Games as part of the athletics programme was held at the Jawaharlal Nehru Stadium on Thursday 7 October till Saturday 9 October 2010.

The top three runners in each of the initial six heats automatically qualified for the second round. The next six fastest runners from across the heats also qualified. Those 24 runners competed in 3 semifinals, with the top two runners from each heat qualifying for the final plus the two fastest runners.

Records

Round 1
First 3 in each heat (Q) and 6 best performers (q) advance to the Semifinals.

Heat 1

Heat 2

Heat 3

Heat 4

Heat 5

Heat 6

Semifinals
First 2 in each heat (Q) and 2 best performers (q) advance to the Final.

Semifinal 1

Semifinal 2

Semifinal 3

Final

External links
2010 Commonwealth Games - Athletics

Men's 400
2010